The 1988 Tennessee Volunteers football team represented the University of Tennessee in the 1988 season. Playing as a member of the Southeastern Conference (SEC), the team was led by head coach Johnny Majors, in his 12th year, and played their home games at Neyland Stadium in Knoxville, Tennessee. They finished the season with a record of five wins and six losses (5–6 overall, 3–4 in the SEC). The Vols' offense scored 212 points while the defense allowed 286 points.

Schedule

Team players drafted into the NFL

Reference:

References

Tennessee
Tennessee Volunteers football seasons
Tennessee Volunteers football